Oleksandr Yevheniyovych Yarovenko (born 19 December 1987) is a Ukrainian professional footballer who plays as a centre-forward for Ukrainian club VPK-Ahro Shevchenkivka.

Personal life
He is the son of football manager and former footballer Yevhen Yarovenko.

References

External links
 Profile on VPK-Ahro Shevchenkivka official website
 
 

1987 births
Living people
Sportspeople from Almaty
Kazakhstani people of Ukrainian descent
Ukrainian footballers
Association football forwards
FC Shakhtar-2 Donetsk players
FC Shakhtar-3 Donetsk players
FC Kryvbas Kryvyi Rih players
FC Kyzylzhar players
FC Stal Kamianske players
FC Dnipro-75 Dnipropetrovsk players
FC Helios Kharkiv players
FC Tytan Armyansk players
FC Naftovyk-Ukrnafta Okhtyrka players
FC Taraz players
FC Rubin Yalta players
PFC Sumy players
FC Kolos Kovalivka players
MFC Mykolaiv players
FC Metalurh Zaporizhzhia players
FK Kom players
FC Dinaz Vyshhorod players
FC VPK-Ahro Shevchenkivka players
Ukrainian First League players
Ukrainian Second League players
Kazakhstan Premier League players
Crimean Premier League players
Montenegrin First League players
Ukrainian expatriate footballers
Expatriate footballers in Kazakhstan
Ukrainian expatriate sportspeople in Kazakhstan
Expatriate footballers in Montenegro
Ukrainian expatriate sportspeople in Montenegro